William Dale Cardwell (born 1962 in Greenville, Kentucky) is a consumer investigator and television journalist based in Atlanta, Georgia. In 2001, Cardwell and his family were placed in the protective custody of police when Cardwell appeared on a "hit list," based on his investigative reporting of corruption in DeKalb County, Georgia.

Cardwell is the host of TrustDaleTV, a consumer problem-solving show, airing multiple times and multiple cities per week including WANF and Peachtree TV in Atlanta, WTSP News 10 in Tampa as well as KTVT CBS in Dallas, Texas. Cardwell also hosts TrustDale Radio in five states and nationally on I Heart Radio. Off air, Cardwell owns and operates TrustDale.com, a venue where consumers can read recommendations for products and services across numerous "categories."   Cardwell collects an advertising pool fee from each company listed with his service. Cardwell claimed to the Atlanta Journal-Constitutions Rodney Ho, "I choose the companies, they didn't choose me."  
Cardwell was previously a long-time investigative reporter for Atlanta's WSB-TV. Before that, he worked for Nashville, Tennessee's WSMV, WRAL-TV in Raleigh/Durham, and also served stints at TV stations in Birmingham, Alabama and western Kentucky.

Cardwell chose to leave conventional news reporting to mount a campaign for the United States Senate in United States Senate election in Georgia, 2008.  His reported goal was  "to reclaim America from the special interests that pay for and choose candidates."  In support of this campaign position he chose to refuse special interest "PAC" financing.  He was eliminated in the July 15, 2008 primary.

References

External links
 Cardwell's (Atlanta-based) "Consumer Solutions" Network
 Cardwell Campaign site
 Biography at WSB-TV
 Profile at SourceWatch
 OurCampaigns.com Candidate Details
 WSB-TV: 'Dale Cardwell makes Senate Bid official today' Article
 Ledger-Enquirer: Cardwell blasts Chambliss vote against children's healthcare plan
 Says Cardwell: Chambliss is a 'borrow-and-spend pawn of the special interests'

American television journalists
Living people
1962 births
People from Greenville, Kentucky
Television personalities from Atlanta
Georgia (U.S. state) Democrats
American male journalists